Tepee Creek may refer to:

Tepee Creek (Montana)
Tepee Creek (Fall River County, South Dakota)
Tepee Creek (Meade and Miner counties, South Dakota)